{{DISPLAYTITLE:C21H30N2O}}
The molecular formula C21H30N2O (molar mass: 326.484 g/mol, exact mass: 326.2358 u) may refer to:

 Bunaftine
 Hydroxystenozole, also known as 17α-methylandrost-4-eno[3,2-c]pyrazol-17β-ol

Molecular formulas